The 2008/09 FIS Nordic Combined World Cup was the 26th world cup season, a combination of ski jumping and cross-country skiing organized by FIS. It began in Kuusamo on 29 November 2008. Anssi Koivuranta from Finland became overall winner. Hannu Manninen retired before the season began.

Changes
This World Cup is the first season with a new system. Instead of a sprint (1x jump and 7,5 km cross country skiing race) and Gundersen (2x jumps and 1x 15 km cross country skiing race), there is now a combined competition with a single jump and a single 10 km cross country skiing race. The Masstart is unchanged. The Relay is now 5 km Cross country and one jump for every jumper in the team.

Calendar

Men

Team

Standings

Overall 

Standings after 23 events.

Nations Cup 

Standings after 24 event.

Notes

References
FIS-Ski Results
FIS-Ski Cup Standings
FIS Nordic Combined World Cup Results - International Herald Tribune
ESPN - FIS Nordic Combined World Cup Results - Skiing
ESPN - FIS Nordic Combined World Cup Results - Skiing

External links
FIS-Ski Home Nordic Combined - Official Web Site

FIS Nordic Combined World Cup
Fis Nordic Combined World Cup, 2008-09
Fis Nordic Combined World Cup, 2008-09